Sugarloaf Township is a township in Columbia County, Pennsylvania. It is part of Northeastern Pennsylvania. 

The population was eight hundred and ninety at the time of the 2020 census.

History
The Y Covered Bridge No. 156 was listed on the National Register of Historic Places in 1979.

Geography
Sugarloaf Township is located in the northeast corner of Columbia County, and is bordered to the north by Sullivan County and to the east by Luzerne County.

Sugarloaf Township contains the unincorporated communities of Elk Grove, Jamison City, Central, and Grassmere Park.

West Branch Fishing Creek flows southward through the center of the township, part of the Susquehanna River watershed.

Demographics

As of the census of 2000, there were eight hundred and eighty-five people, three hundred and seventy households and two hundred and sixty-three families residing in the township. The population density was 34.2 people per square mile (13.2/km). There were seven hundred and seventy-nine housing units at an average density of 30.1/sq mi (11.6/km). 

The racial makeup of the township was 98.98% White, 0.23% African American, 0.45% Native American, 0.11% Asian, 0.11% from other races, and 0.11% from two or more races. Hispanic or Latino of any race were 0.90% of the population.

There were three hundred and seventy households, out of which 23.8% had children under the age of eighteen living with them; 59.7% were married couples living together, 7.8% had a female householder with no husband present, and 28.9% were non-families. 24.3% of all households were made up of individuals, and 10.3% had someone living alone who was sixty-five years of age or older. The average household size was 2.39 and the average family size was 2.83.

In the township, the population was spread out, with 19.2% under the age of eighteen, 8.1% from eighteen to twenty-four, 27.6% from twenty-five to forty-four, 25.5% from forty-five to sixty-four, and 19.5% who were sixty-five years of age or older. The median age was forty-three years. 

For every one hundred females, there were 106.3 males. For every one hundred females aged eighteen and over, there were 108.5 males.

The median income for a household in the township was $35,521, and the median income for a family was $41,250. Males had a median income of $29,615 compared with that of $20,924 for females. The per capita income for the township was $17,444.

Roughly 4.8% of families and 5.5% of the population were below the poverty line, including 7.6% of those under age eighteen and 2.6% of those aged sixty-five or over.

References

Populated places established in 1792
Bloomsburg–Berwick metropolitan area
Townships in Columbia County, Pennsylvania
Townships in Pennsylvania